INS Kattabomman is the designation of the VLF-transmission facility of the Indian Navy situated at Vijayanarayanam near Tirunelveli in Tamil Nadu. The facility spread over 3,000 acres has 13 masts, which are arranged in two rings around the central mast. The centre mast has a height of 301 metres, the masts on the inner ring measure 276.4 metres, that on the outer ring measure 227.4 metres.

Two further masts of the station carrying an umbrella antenna, the INS Kattabomman is 471 metres tall and the tallest structure in India. They are also the tallest military structure in the world. The facility opened an ELF transmission facility in 2014.

History 

Development and construction of INS Kattabomman started in 1984 as Project Skylark and costed . It was commissioned into service by Indian President Ramaswamy Venkataraman on 20 October 1990. It is named after king Veera Pandya Kattabomman, who died during the Indian independence movement.

After operationalising the base, India became the seventh country in the world to have developed the Very low frequency communication capability.

Further development

VLF upgrades 
On 31 July 2014, a new Very low frequency facility was inaugurated at INS Kattabomman. The upgrade included digitising the control interface.

Extremely low frequency facility 
An Extremely low frequency communication facility is also present near the VLF facility, construction of which commenced in March 2012. The facility is used by the Nuclear Command Authority to communicate with the Arihant-class of submarines.

India is the second country after Russia to actively operate an Extremely low frequency facility; the United States had discontinued using it in 2004. Another such facility is proposed in Damagundam Reserve Forest (approximately at 17°16'N 77°56'E ).

See also
 Indian navy 
 List of Indian Navy bases
 List of active Indian Navy ships

 Integrated commands and units
 Armed Forces Special Operations Division
 Defence Cyber Agency
 Integrated Defence Staff
 Integrated Space Cell
 Indian Nuclear Command Authority
 Indian Armed Forces
 Special Forces of India

 Other topics
 Strategic Forces Command
 List of Indian Air Force stations
 List of Indian Navy bases
 India's overseas military bases
Veerapandiya Kattabomman

References

Communication towers in India
Katta
1990 establishments in Tamil Nadu
Towers completed in 1990
Buildings and structures in Tamil Nadu
20th-century architecture in India